Galbuli is one of the two suborders of the order Piciformes and includes two families Bucconidae (puffbirds) and Galbulidae (jacamars). The other suborder Pici is a global group of piciforms, puffbirds and jacamars are only found in the Neotropics.

Systematics
It was thought the jacamars and puffbirds were not closely related to toucans and woodpeckers, but instead related to the order Coraciiformes. However, analysis of nuclear DNA in a 2003 study placed them as sister group to Pici, also showing that the groups had developed zygodactyl feet (two toes facing forward and two aft) before separating. Per Ericson and colleagues, in analysing genomic DNA, confirmed that puffbirds and jacamars were sister groups and their place in Piciformes. The lineage is sometimes elevated to order level as Galbuliformes, first proposed by Sibley and Ahlquist in 1990.

Taxonomy
The following arrangement of taxa is based on Witt (2004).
Suborder Galbuli
Family Bucconidae
Genus Nonnula
Rusty-breasted nunlet, Nonnula rubecula
Rufous-capped nunlet, Nonnula ruficapilla
Chestnut-headed nunlet, Nonnula amaurocephala
Grey-cheeked nunlet, Nonnula frontalis
Fulvous-chinned nunlet, Nonnula sclateri
Brown nunlet, Nonnula brunnea
Genus Malacoptila
White-chested puffbird, Malacoptila fusca
Semicollared puffbird, Malacoptila semicincta
Crescent-chested puffbird, Malacoptila striata
Black-streaked puffbird, Malacoptila fulvogularis
Rufous-necked puffbird, Malacoptila rufa
White-whiskered puffbird, Malacoptila panamensis
Moustached puffbird, Malacoptila mystacalis
Genus Bucco
Collared puffbird, Bucco capensis
Genus Nystalus
Spot-backed puffbird, Nystalus maculatus
Barred puffbird, Nystalus radiatus
Western striolated puffbird, Nystalus obamai
Eastern striolated puffbird, Nystalus striolatus
White-eared puffbird, Nystalus chacuru
Genus Chelidoptera
Swallow-winged puffbird, Chelidoptera tenebrosa
Genus Monasa
White-fronted nunbird, Monasa morphoeus
Yellow-billed nunbird, Monasa flavirostris
Black-fronted nunbird, Monasa nigrifrons
Black nunbird, Monasa atra
Genus Hapaloptila
White-faced nunbird, Hapaloptila castanea
Genus Micromonacha
Lanceolated monklet, Micromonacha lanceolata
Genus Cyphos
Chestnut-capped puffbird, Cyphos macrodactylus
Genus Hypnelus
Russet-throated puffbird, Hypnelus ruficollis
Genus 
Spotted puffbird, Nystactes tamatia
Sooty-capped puffbird, Nystactes noanamae
Genus Notharchus
Brown-banded puffbird, Notharchus ordii
Pied puffbird, Notharchus tectus
Black-breasted puffbird, Notharchus pectoralis
White-necked puffbird, Notharchus hyperrynchus
Guianan puffbird, Notharchus macrorhynchos
Buff-bellied puffbird, Notharchus swainsoni
Family Galbulidae
Genus: Jacamaralcyon
Three-toed jacamar, Jacamaralcyon tridactyla
Genus Brachygalba
Dusky-backed jacamar, Brachygalba salmoni
Pale-headed jacamar, Brachygalba goeringi
Brown jacamar, Brachygalba lugubris
White-throated jacamar, Brachygalba albogularis
Genus Jacamerops
Great jacamar, Jacamerops aureus
Genus Galbalcyrhynchus
White-eared jacamar, Galbalcyrhynchus leucotis
Purus jacamar, Galbalcyrhynchus purusianus
Genus Galbula
Yellow-billed jacamar, Galbula albirostris
Blue-necked jacamar, Galbula cyanicollis
Rufous-tailed jacamar, Galbula ruficauda
Coppery-chested jacamar, Galbula pastazae
Green-tailed jacamar, Galbula galbula
White-chinned jacamar, Galbula tombacea
Bluish-fronted jacamar, Galbula cyanescens
Purplish jacamar, Galbula chalcothorax
Bronzy jacamar, Galbula leucogastra
Paradise jacamar, Galbula dea

References

External links
 Tree of Life Piciformes